Flinders University is a public research university based in Adelaide, South Australia, with a footprint extending across 11 locations in South Australia and the Northern Territory. Founded in 1966, it was named in honour of British navigator Matthew Flinders, who explored and surveyed the Australian and South Australian coastline in the early 19th century.

Flinders' main campus at Bedford Park in Adelaide's south is set upon 156 acres of gardens and native bushland, making it a verdant university . Other campuses include Tonsley, Adelaide Central Business District, Renmark, Alice Springs, and Darwin.  It is a member of the Innovative Research Universities (IRU) Group. Academically, the university pioneered a cross-disciplinary approach to education, and its faculties of medicine and the humanities have been ranked among the nation's top 10.

The 2021 Times Higher Education ranking of the world's top universities places Flinders in the 251 – 300th bracket, at 266 in the world.

The Quacquarelli Symonds rating agency named Flinders University in its inaugural 2023 QS Recognition of Internationalisation awards, one of four awardees worldwide.

Flinders University leads the nation in postgraduate employment outcomes  according to the 2021 Graduate Outcome Survey - Longitudinal, released by the Australian Government's Quality Indicators for Learning and Teaching.

History

Origins and construction

By the late 1950s, the University of Adelaide's North Terrace campus was approaching capacity. In 1960, Premier Thomas Playford announced that  of state government-owned land in Burbank (now Bedford Park) would be allocated to the University of Adelaide for the establishment of a second campus.

Planning began in 1961. The principal-designate of the new campus, economist and professor Peter Karmel, was adamant that the new campus should operate independently from the North Terrace campus. He hoped that the Bedford Park campus would be free to innovate and not be bound by tradition.

Capital works began in 1962 with a grant of £3.8 million from the Australian Universities Commission. Architect Geoff Harrison, in conjunction with architectural firm Hassell, McConnell and Partners, designed a new university that, with future expansions, could eventually accommodate up to 6000 students.

Independence and opening
In 1965, the Australian Labor Party won the state election and Frank Walsh became premier. The ALP wished to break up the University of Adelaide's hegemony over tertiary education in the state, and announced that they intended the Bedford Park campus to be an independent institution.

On 17 March 1966, a bill was passed by state parliament officially creating the Flinders University of South Australia. Although the Labor Party had favoured the name "University of South Australia", academic staff wished that the university be named after a "distinguished but uncontroversial" person. They settled upon British navigator Matthew Flinders, who explored and surveyed the South Australian coastline in 1802. Its coat of arms, designed by a professor in the Fine Arts faculty, includes a reproduction of Flinders' ship Investigator and his journal A Voyage to Terra Australis, open to the page in which Flinders described the coast adjacent the campus site.

Flinders University was opened by Her Majesty Queen Elizabeth, the Queen Mother, on 25 March 1966. Peter Karmel was the first Vice-Chancellor and Sir Mark Mitchell the first Chancellor. The university commenced teaching on 7 March 1966 with a student enrolment of 400.

A significant early initiative was the decision to build the Flinders Medical Centre on land adjacent to the campus and to base the university's Medical School within this new public hospital – the first such integration in Australia. Flinders accepted undergraduate medical students in 1974, with the FMC opening the following year.

Expansion and restructuring

In 1990, the biggest building project on campus since the mid-1970s saw work commence on three new buildings – Law and Commerce; Engineering; and Information Science and Technology.  Approval for the establishment of a School of Engineering was given in 1991 and degrees in Electrical and Electronic Engineering and Biomedical Engineering were established shortly afterwards.

In 1991, as part of a restructuring of higher education in South Australia, Flinders merged with the adjacent Sturt Campus of the former South Australian College of Advanced Education.

In 1992 a four-faculty structure was adopted.

In 1998, the Centre for Remote Health, a rural teaching hospital based in Alice Springs, was established jointly with the Northern Territory University (now Charles Darwin University).  This was expanded further in 2011 with the establishment of the Northern Territory Medical Program.

Since 2000 the university has established new disciplines in areas including Physiotherapy, Occupational Therapy and more disciplines of Engineering.

In 2011, the bacteria genus Flindersiella was named after the university after the strain was found on a tree on campus grounds.

In 2015, the university opened a new campus at Tonsley, the former site of the Mitsubishi Motors Australia plant in Southern Adelaide.  This campus houses the university's School of Computer Science, Engineering and Mathematics, along with the Medical Device Research Institute, the Centre for Nanoscale Science and Technology (now known as the Flinders Institute for Nanoscale Science & Technology) and Flinders technology start-up company Re-Timer.

In 2016, the university celebrated its 50th anniversary with a calendar of public events, and a publication summarising the highlights of the university's history, research, and alumni achievements over the last 50 years. 2016 also saw the opening of the award-winning student hub and plaza, transforming the central campus.

On 1 July 2017, the university restructured from a two-tier academic system of four faculties and 14 schools, to a single-tier structure consisting of six colleges.

The university's strategic plan Making a Difference - The 2025 Agenda released in 2016 set an ambitious vision for the coming decade for Flinders to reach the top ten of Australian Universities, and the top one per cent in the world.

In 2019 the university announced an additional $100 million investment in research and a further $100 million in education over a five-year period to support it to meet its strategic goals.

The university also in 2019 announced plans for a substantial development on a tract on land on the northern portion of the Bedford Park Campus adjacent to the Flinders hospitals precinct. Known as Flinders Village the decade-long development will deliver research facilities, student accommodation, commercial premises and amenities. The catalyst for the initiative was the extension of the Clovelly Park rail line to the Flinders precinct. The $141m rail line and Flinders Station project began operation in December 2020. Stage one of the Flinders Village development is the construction of a Health and Medical Research Building. Construction began in December 2021 and the building, which will be home to Flinders Health and Medical Research Institute, is scheduled for completion in 2024.

In 2021 the University announced it would be expanding its Central Business District presence, establishing a vertical campus as the anchor tenant in Festival Tower, a major development scheduled for completion in 2024 adjacent to Parliament House and the Adelaide Railway Station on North Terrace.

In 2022,  the newly elected state Labor government led by Peter Malinauskas proposed setting up a commission to investigate the possibility of a merger of South Australia's three public universities UniSA, University of Adelaide and Flinders University.

Campuses
The university's main campus is in the Adelaide inner southern suburb of Bedford Park, about 12 km south of the Adelaide city centre.  The university also has a presence in Victoria Square in the centre of the city, and Tonsley. It also maintains a number of external teaching facilities in regional South Australia, south-west Victoria and the Northern Territory. As of 2020 international students made up 19.5% of the on-campus student population and a number of offshore programmes are also offered, primarily in the Asia-Pacific region.

Organisation

Flinders University offers more than 160 undergraduate and postgraduate courses, as well as higher degree research supervision across all disciplines. Many courses use new information and communication technologies to supplement face-to-face teaching and provide flexible options.

Colleges
College of Business, Government and Law
College of Education, Psychology and Social Work
College of Humanities, Arts and Social Sciences
College of Medicine and Public Health
College of Nursing and Health Sciences
College of Science and Engineering

Chancellory 

Flinders University has been served by six Chancellors and eight Vice Chancellors since its establishment in 1966. They are:

Affiliates
Australian Science and Mathematics School
Flinders Medical Centre
The Adelaide Theological Centre Brooklyn Park (comprising the Catholic Theological College and the Uniting College for Leadership and Theology replacing the Adelaide College of Divinity)
Helpmann Academy

Academic profile

Rankings

Flinders University is amongst the world's top 300 institutions at 266 according to the 2022 Times Higher Education rankings.

Student life

Housing
Flinders has  two options regarding on-campus accommodation:
University Hall (catered)
Deirdre Jordan Village (self-catered).

For off-campus accommodation, Flinders Housing run a free, up-to-date accommodation service which lists private accommodation available on the rental market.

Media
Empire Times was published by the Students' Association of Flinders University (SAFU) from 1969 to 2006. The founder and first editor of the newspaper was Martin Fabinyi, and the newspaper was originally printed in the back of his house by fellow student Rod Boswell. Empire Times had a history of controversial humour and anti-establishment discussion. Notable former editors and contributors included Martin Armiger and Greig (HG Nelson) Pickhaver, Steph Key and Kate Ellis. Empire Times ceased publication in 2006 as a result of voluntary student unionism, but resumed in 2013.

Sports
Flinders University has many sports teams that compete in social and competitive competitions.

Flinders University  has 22 affiliated sporting clubs including Aikido, Athletics, Badminton, Baseball, Basketball, Cricket, CrossFit, Football, Hockey, Kendo, Korfball, Lacrosse, Men's Soccer, Muay Thai, Netball, Quidditch Squash, Ultimate Frisbee, Underwater, Volleyball, Wing Chun and Women's Soccer.

Additionally, Flinders University students have the capacity to go away to annual university games events and compete in a range of sports while representing the university.

Notable people

Entertainment and the arts
Mario Andreacchio – film director and producer
Benedict Andrews – theatre director 
Donald Brook – Emeritus Professor of Visual Arts
Matt Crook - actor
Alex Frayne – film director
Noni Hazlehurst – actress
Scott Hicks – film director
Victoria Hill – actress, writer and producer
Aimee Horne – actress and singer
Craig Lahiff – film director
Nina Landis – actress
Caleb Lewis – playwright
Sam Mac – radio and television personality
Anthony Maras – film director, writer and producer
Louisa Mignone - actress
Doc Neeson – singer, songwriter and front man of The Angels
Gian Carlo Petraccaro – film director
Greig Pickhaver (also known as H.G. Nelson) – actor, comedian and writer
Dario Russo - film director and writer
Xavier Samuel – actor
John Schumann – Michael Atkinson, Verity Truman, Chris Timms (founding members of Redgum)
Wendy Strehlow – actress
Eddie White – animation writer and director

Humanities
Jack Barbalet – professor of sociology
Carl Bridge – professor of history at King's College, London
Marion Maddox – author and professor of history at Macquarie University
Haydon Manning – political scientist
Wesley Wildman – professor of theology at Boston University
Graham Hill – associate professor of missiology and World Christianity at the University of Divinity

Medicine
Nazira Abdula, pediatrician and Mozambican Minister of Health
Jamie Cooper - professor of intensive care medicine
Richard "Harry" Harris - anaesthetist and 2019 Australian of the Year
Graeme Young - gastroenterologist, developer of the national bowel cancer screening programme
Sally Goold - First Indigenous nurse in New South Wales and 2006 Senior Nurse of the Year
 Marcello Costa AO - neuroscientist,understanding of gut neuronal structure and function.

Politics
John Bannon – former South Australian Premier
Zoe Bettison – South Australian state politician and Minister
Susan Close – South Australian state politician, Minister and Deputy Premier
David Cox – Member of the Australian House of Representatives
Kate Ellis – Member of the Australian House of Representatives and Minister
Bronwyn Halfpenny – Member of the Victorian Legislative Assembly
Ian Hunter – South Australian state politician and Minister
Tom Kenyon – South Australian state politician and Minister
Stephanie Key – South Australian state politician and Minister
Jenny Leong – Member of the New South Wales Legislative Assembly
Brendan Nelson – former Australian Leader of the Opposition
Chris Picton – South Australian state politician and Minister 
Mike Rann – former Premier, appointed as a Flinders University professor
Amanda Rishworth – Member of the Australian House of Representatives
Don Russell – former Australian Ambassador to the United States
Robert Simms – Australian Senator
Andrew Southcott – Member of the Australian House of Representatives
Gayle Tierney – Member of the Victorian Legislative Council
Sialeʻataonga Tuʻivakanō – Prime Minister of Tonga
Lynne Walker – Northern Territory Deputy Leader of the Opposition
Pratikno – Minister of State Secretariat of the Republic of Indonesia
Nicolle Flint – Member of the Australian House of Representatives

Science and mathematics
Rod Boswell – professor, Plasma Research Laboratory, ANU
Philip Bourne – professor of pharmacology at UCSD
Rodney Brooks – professor of robotics at MIT
Sabine Dittmann – marine biologist
Mohammad Kaykobad – Computer Scientist, Professor of CSE, BUET
Mamoru Mohri – retired astronaut, scientist and engineer
Colin Raston - professor of green chemistry, SA Scientist of the Year inventor of the Vortex Fluidic Device
Terence Tao – Fields Medalist, professor of mathematics at UCLA
Tony Thomas – professor of physics at the University of Adelaide

Sport
Matthew Liptak – Adelaide Crows footballer
Agnes Milowka – technical diver and author
Nigel Smart – Adelaide Crows footballer

Writers

Mem Fox - children's author
Hannah Kent - author, winner of the Stella Prize
Sean Williams - multi awarded author of novels and short stories for adults, young people and children  
Peter Martin – economics journalist and commentator (Distinguished Alumnus 2016)
Sudesh Mishra – poet
Christopher Pearson – journalist, founder of the Adelaide Review and speechwriter for Prime Minister John Howard
Mark Peel – Australian historian
Petar Pjesivac – Serbian poet and essayist

To date, Flinders has produced one Australian of the Year in Richard Harris, one Fields Medalist in Terry Tao, five Rhodes scholars. and 26 Fulbright scholars.

See also

AusStage
Flinders University AusStage Prize
List of universities in Australia

References

External links

Flinders University
The Flinders University of South Australia Act 1966

Universities in South Australia
Education in Adelaide
Educational institutions established in 1966
Nursing schools in Australia
Australian vocational education and training providers

1966 establishments in Australia